Heike Murrweiss (born 1 January 1966) is a German former handball player. She competed in the women's tournament at the 1996 Summer Olympics.

References

External links
 

1966 births
Living people
German female handball players
Olympic handball players of Germany
Handball players at the 1996 Summer Olympics
Sportspeople from Heilbronn